Butterby Oxbow  is a Site of Special Scientific Interest in the Durham City district of County Durham, England. It consists of a former meander of the River Wear which was isolated from the main river in 1811 when, to reduce flooding in the area, a new channel was constructed across the neck of the meander. It is located about 3 km south of the centre of Durham and 1.2 km north of the nearest village, Croxdale.

It is locally important as a roosting and wintering area for wildfowl.

References

Sites of Special Scientific Interest in County Durham